Rainbow is a public art work by artist Duayne Hatchett located at the Lynden Sculpture Garden near Milwaukee, Wisconsin. This piece was named after the color “rainbow”. The sculpture's abstract form is in the shape of an arc; it is installed on the lawn.

References

Outdoor sculptures in Milwaukee
1970 sculptures
Aluminum sculptures in Wisconsin
Abstract sculptures in Wisconsin
1970 establishments in Wisconsin
Rainbows in art